HMS Fitzroy has been the name of more than one British ship of the Royal Navy, and may refer to:

 , a  minesweeper completed as a survey ship, later minesweeper, launched in 1919 and sunk in 1942

Royal Navy ship names